Aaron James Whitefield (born 2 September 1996) is an Australian professional baseball outfielder in the Los Angeles Angels organization. He made his MLB debut in 2020 with the Minnesota Twins.

Career
Whitefield began his career playing fastpitch softball. Whitefield won the bronze medal at the 2012 U-18 Men's Softball World Cup as a member of Australia's national softball team.

Minnesota Twins
After signing with the Minnesota Twins of Major League Baseball in 2015, Whitefield was assigned to the Gulf Coast Twins of the Rookie-level Gulf Coast League. He played in only seven games for the Twins due to visa issues. After the season, he played for the Brisbane Bandits of the Australian Baseball League (ABL) for 2015–16 ABL season. In 2016, Whitefield returned to the Gulf Coast League and played in 51 games, posting a .298 batting average with two home runs, 17 RBIs and 31 stolen bases. After the season, he played for the Brisbane Bandits of the ABL for 2016–17 ABL season and winning three consecutive championships with the club and the league MVP award.

In 2017, Whitefield played for the Cedar Rapids Kernels of the Class A Midwest League, where he batted .262 with 11 home runs, 57 RBIs, and 33 stolen bases. After the season, he played for the Brisbane Bandits of the ABL for 2017–18 ABL season. Whitfield spent the 2018 season with the Fort Myers Miracle of the Class A-Advanced Florida State League. He hit .211 with two home runs, 25 stolen bases, and ten RBIs in 65 games. After the season, he joined to the Adelaide Bite of the ABL for the 2018–19 ABL season.

After the 2019 season, he joined to the Adelaide Bite of the ABL for the 2019–20 ABL season.

On 29 June 2020, Whitefield made the Twins 60-man summer camp roster in 2020. He made the Twins Opening Day roster in 2020. On 25 July 2020, he made his MLB debut in the ninth inning against the Chicago White Sox as a pinch runner for Eddie Rosario. On August 10, Whitefield was outrighted off of the 40-man roster. Whitefield spent the 2021 season with Double-A Wichita Wind Surge, slashing .257/.327/.353 with 6 home runs and 58 RBI in 111 games. On November 7, 2021, he elected free agency.

Los Angeles Angels
On 10 November 2021, Whitefield signed a minor league contract with the Los Angeles Angels organization. On 8 May 2022, he was promoted to the Angels' main roster after playing for the Double-A Rocket City Trash Pandas of the Southern League, where he batted .301 with 5 home runs, 17 RBIs, and 13 stolen bases. He was designated for assignment on 14 May 2022 and he cleared waivers on 18 May, and was outrighted to Double-A Rocket City Trash Pandas.

International career
Whitefield has played for the Australian national baseball team in the 2017 World Baseball Classic Qualification in 2016, 2017 World Baseball Classic 2019 WBSC Premier12, and 2023 World Baseball Classic.

Personal life
Whitefield's father, John, played fastpitch softball for New Zealand's national team, and his mother, Nicole Molander, played softball in Queensland and for the Australian national team.

References

External links
, or ABL

1996 births
Living people
Adelaide Bite players
Australian expatriate baseball players in the United States
Baseball players from Brisbane
Brisbane Bandits players
Cedar Rapids Kernels players
Fort Myers Miracle players
Gulf Coast Twins players
Los Angeles Angels players
Major League Baseball outfielders
Major League Baseball players from Australia
Minnesota Twins players
National baseball team players
Pensacola Blue Wahoos players
Wichita Wind Surge players
2017 World Baseball Classic players
2023 World Baseball Classic players